Conductive hearing loss (CHL) occurs when there is a problem transferring sound waves anywhere along the pathway through the outer ear, tympanic membrane (eardrum), or middle ear (ossicles). If a conductive hearing loss occurs in conjunction with a sensorineural hearing loss, it is referred to as a mixed hearing loss. Depending upon the severity and nature of the conductive loss, this type of hearing impairment can often be treated with surgical intervention or pharmaceuticals to partially or, in some cases, fully restore hearing acuity to within normal range. However, cases of permanent or chronic conductive hearing loss may require other treatment modalities such as hearing aid devices to improve detection of sound and speech perception.

Causes 
Common causes of conductive hearing loss include:

External ear 
 Cerumen (earwax) or foreign body in the external auditory canal
 Otitis externa, infection or irritation of the outer ear
 Exostoses, abnormal growth of bone within the ear canal
 Tumor of the ear canal
 Congenital stenosis or atresia of the external auditory canal (narrow or blocked ear canal).
 Ear canal stenosis & atresia can exist independently or may result from congenital malformations of the auricle such as microtia or anotia.
 Acquired stenosis (narrowing) of the external auditory canal following surgery or radiotherapy

Middle ear 
Fluid accumulation is the most common cause of conductive hearing loss in the middle ear, especially in children. Major causes are ear infections or conditions that block the eustachian tube, such as allergies or tumors. Blocking of the eustachian tube leads to decreased pressure in the middle ear relative to the external ear, and this causes decreased motion of both the ossicles and the tympanic membrane.
 Acute or Serous otitis media
 Chronic suppurative otitis media (CSOM)
 Perforated eardrum
 Tympanosclerosis or scarring of the eardrum
 Cholesteatoma
 Eustachian Tube Dysfunction, inflammation or mass within the nasal cavity, middle ear, or eustachian tube itself
 Otosclerosis, abnormal growth of bone in or near the middle ear
 Middle ear tumour
 Ossicular discontinuity as a consequence of infection or temporal bone trauma
 Congenital malformation of the ossicles. This can be an isolated phenomenon or can occur as part of a syndrome where development of the 1st and 2nd branchial arches is seen such as in Goldenhar syndrome, Treacher Collins syndrome, branchio-oto-renal syndrome etc.
 Barotrauma, unequal air pressures in the external and middle ear. This can temporarily occur, for example, by the environmental pressure changes as when shifting altitude, or inside a train going into a tunnel. It is managed by any of various methods of ear clearing manoeuvres to equalize the pressures, like swallowing, yawning, or the Valsalva manoeuvre. More severe barotrauma can lead to middle ear fluid or even permanent sensorineural hearing loss.

Inner ear 
Third window effect caused by:
 Superior canal dehiscence – which may require surgical correction.
 Enlarged vestibular aqueduct
 Labyrinthine fistula

Presentation
Conductive hearing loss makes all sounds seem faint or muffled. The hearing loss is usually worse in lower frequencies.
Congenital conductive hearing loss is identified through newborn hearing screening or may be identified because the baby has microtia or other facial abnormalities. Conductive hearing loss developing during childhood is usually due to otitis media with effusion and may present with speech and language delay or difficulty hearing. Later onset of conductive hearing loss may have an obvious cause such as an ear infection, trauma or upper respiratory tract infection or may have an insidious onset related to chronic middle ear disease, otosclerosis or a tumour of the naso-pharynx. Earwax is a very common cause of a conductive hearing loss which may present suddenly when the wax blocks sound from getting through the external ear canal to the middle and inner ear.

Diagnosis
Diagnosis requires a detailed history, local examination of the ear, nose, throat and neck, and detailed hearing tests. In children a more detailed examination may be required if the hearing loss is congenital.

Otoscopy
Examination of the external ear canal and ear drum is important and may help identify problems located in the outer ear up to the tympanic membrane.

Differential testing
For basic screening, a conductive hearing loss can be identified using the Rinne test with a 256 Hz tuning fork. The Rinne test, in which a patient is asked to say whether a vibrating tuning fork is heard more loudly adjacent to the ear canal (air conduction) or touching the bone behind the ear (bone conduction), is negative indicating that bone conduction is more effective that air conduction. A normal, or positive, result, is when air conduction is more effective than bone conduction.

With a one-sided conductive component the combined use of both the Weber and Rinne tests is useful. If the Weber test is used, in which a vibrating tuning fork is touched to the midline of the forehead, the person will hear the sound more loudly in the affected ear because background noise does not mask the hearing on this side.

The following table compares sensorineural hearing loss to conductive:

Tympanometry
Tympanometry, or acoustic immitance testing, is a simple objective test of the ability of the middle ear to transmit sound waves from the outer ear to the middle ear and to the inner ear. This test is usually abnormal with conductive hearing loss.  A type B tympanogram reveals a flat response, due to fluid in the middle ear (otitis media), or an eardrum perforation. A type C tympanogram indicates negative middle ear pressure, which is commonly seen in eustachian tube dysfunction. A type As tympanogram indicates a shallow compliance of the middle ear, which is commonly seen in otosclerosis.

Audiometry
Pure tone audiometry, a standardized hearing test over a set of frequencies from 250 Hz to 8000 Hz, may be conducted by a medical doctor, audiologist or audiometrist, with the result plotted separately for each ear on an audiogram. The shape of the plot reveals the degree and nature of hearing loss, distinguishing conductive hearing loss from other kinds of hearing loss. A conductive hearing loss is characterized by a difference of at least 15 decibels between the air conduction threshold and bone conduction threshold at the same frequency. On an audiogram, the "x" represents responses in the left ear at each frequency, while the "o" represents responses in right ear at each frequency.

CT scan
Most causes of conductive hearing loss can be identified by examination but if it is important to image the bones of the middle ear or inner ear then a CT scan is required. CT scan is useful in cases of congenital conductive hearing loss, chronic suppurative otitis media or cholesteatoma, ossicular damage or discontinuity, otosclerosis and third window dehiscence. Specific MRI scans can be used to identify cholesteatoma.

Pathophysiology

Management
Management falls into three modalities: surgical treatment, pharmaceutical treatment, and supportive, depending on the nature and location of the specific cause.

In cases of infection, antibiotics or antifungal medications are an option. Some conditions are amenable to surgical intervention such as middle ear fluid, cholesteatoma, and otosclerosis. If conductive hearing loss is due to head trauma, surgical repair is an option. If absence or deformation of ear structures cannot be corrected, or if the patient declines surgery, hearing aids which amplify sounds are a possible treatment option. Bone conduction hearing aids are useful as these deliver sound directly, through bone, to the cochlea or organ of hearing bypassing the pathology. These can be on a soft or hard headband or can be inserted surgically, a bone anchored hearing aid, of which there are several types. Conventional air conduction hearing aids can also be used.

See also
 Hearing loss
 Sensorineural hearing loss

References

External links 

Hearing loss
Audiology
Otology